Stealing Candy is a 2003 thriller film directed by Mark L. Lester and starring Daniel Baldwin.

Premise
The film revolves around three ex-cons who kidnap a famous Hollywood actress known for refusing to do nude scenes and persuade her to have sex on camera for a pay-per-view website.

By the end, it is revealed that Candy and one of the cons, Fred, were in it from the get-go, and orchestrated the entire thing to promote her career. In a final backstab she makes it appear as if he threatens her life, and perform a murder-by-cop on him. (Thus making sure the truth would never be revealed)

Cast
 Daniel Baldwin as Walt Gearson
 Coolio as Brad Vorman
 Alex McArthur as Fred Dowd
 Jenya Lano as Candy Tyler
 Jeff Wincott as Spinell

References

External links
 
 

2003 films
2003 thriller films
American thriller films
Films about pornography
Films directed by Mark L. Lester
2000s English-language films
2000s American films